The Velvet Rope Tour was the third concert tour by American recording artist Janet Jackson. Launched in support of her sixth studio album The Velvet Rope (1997), the tour visited Europe, North America, Japan, New Zealand, Africa, and Australia. Jackson was inspired to create an autobiographical show using elements of Broadway theatre, portraying her struggle with depression and self-esteem. The tour's stage production was developed as a storybook setting, allowing spectators to cross beyond her "velvet rope" and experience her life story through the evolution of her musical career. It consists of twenty-six songs, several band interludes, and intense choreography along with nine costume changes and four sets. Jackson depicts themes such as burlesque and domestic violence among the show's complex production of pyrotechnics and theatrics.

Its setlist was composed of a wide array of Jackson's discography, focusing on new material in addition to medleys of previous hits. The tour is divided into five segments, each displaying different themes and settings. In "What About", Its racy visuals and depictions of violence drew controversy. In her rendition of "Rope Burn", Jackson selects a fan from the audience, performing a lap dance and kissing them while strapped into a chair. The show's suggestive promotional ads were banned from a number of publications, the image was reported to cause traffic accidents in Europe. A number of reviews commended Jackson's stage presence as consistently exceptional, noting improvement in her vocal delivery. It broke several attendance records and is the most attended stadium concert of all time in Hawaii. A private show was held in Brunei by request of Princess Hamidah, for her twenty-first birthday.

HBO broadcast the show during a special titled The Velvet Rope: Live in Madison Square Garden. It drew over 15 million viewers and was the most watched program among homes subscribed to the network. The special won an Emmy Award, and was also nominated for Image Awards and TMF Awards. It was released on DVD as The Velvet Rope Tour – Live in Concert, certified platinum in several territories. Various aspects of the tour have influenced numerous performers, including Britney Spears, Pink, Rihanna, Christina Aguilera, Panic! at the Disco, Jay-Z, and Arashi. Jackson notably selected NSYNC and Usher to open for the tour; introducing both to the public during their early careers. It has also inspired the careers of several performers, dancers, and professional choreographers.

Development
Jackson developed the tour as an audiovisual storybook, sharing her life experience through the evolution of her music. Catherine McHugh of Entertainment Design reports "Part of the reason Janet Jackson titled her latest record The Velvet Rope was to criticize barriers that separate different classes in society. So from the beginning of her show, Jackson strives to prove her accessibility to her audience. The spectacular opening presents Jackson's life—at least professionally—as an open book." The stage was designed by Mark Fisher, saying "She wanted to have a book opening and herself come out of it. So I finessed that book into the video screen." Fisher explained, "Each different scene in the show would be akin to turning the pages in this book, and all the albums that she'd done in the past—Control, Rhythm Nation, janet.—would be represented." Regarding its introduction, Fisher said, "The elevator deposits her gracefully, as befits a princess, on the very front of the downstage." "And of course, the entirely cool and wonderful and breaking-new-ground aspect of it is that it's all made possible by a thin LED screen." Roy Bennett stated "We talked about developing the show around the scenarios of her career. I kept that in mind while lighting each different scene, but I tried to do it in an abstract way, without jumping too far away from the overall look of the show."

Jackson said, "To me, being onstage is about entertaining. I know there are people who just walk onstage and give you a show by just doing their music, but I always wanted something extra." Jackson conceptualized the tour in Paris, saying "I knew what I wanted everyone to look like, especially for the opening number. I knew what I wanted everyone to wear. I visualized the whole thing." Jackson desired to create new themes for prior hits to avoid repeating previous performances. The tour's logo is a variation of Akan symbol the Sankofa, meaning "you can't move into the future until you understand your past." Jackson tattooed the symbol onto her wrist and used the image frequently throughout the tour's promotional imagery.

Controversy
The tour's promotional advertisements were controversial for their provocative imagery. The image depicts Jackson in a "clingy, breast-enhancing bodysuit with what appears to be a nipple ring on the bodysuit's exterior and high-cut bikini panties." Several publications refused to publish the ad when they could not determine a way to present the image. Ken DeLisa, corporate affairs manager of The Courant, said the photo did not meet the publication's standards. Jackson's spokeswoman said the tour's producers rejected proposed alterations, adding certain publications "sent back an image that colored Janet's bosom to appear as a sports bra." A billboard of the image in England was also removed after its suggestive nature led to multiple traffic accidents. The tour drew comparisons to Madonna's 1993 Girlie Show Tour, and the UK's Q magazine commented that Jackson borrowed some elements from her pop adversary for her tour.

The tour's rendition of "Rope Burn" was considered "incredibly sexy" and "what everyone was talking about", becoming its most controversial performance. During the act, Jackson "plucks a male fan out of the crowd and ties his hands to the arms of a chair on stage while she gyrates around him and eventually kisses him." The selected fan was required to be strapped into the chair due to safety concerns from Jackson's previous tour, after the participant had forcefully grabbed and fondled her while onstage. Jackson said, "Everyone thinks it's this kinky thing. But the reason he gets strapped in is on this last tour, this guy grabbed my crotch. I sat on his lap and then I stood up and he grabbed my crotch, and I was trying to move his hand and he was too strong for me and he was just rubbing on my crotch. There was nothing I could do, so I said to myself I would never let that happen again." Jackson's performance of "What About" is also infamous for its portrayal of domestic violence and abuse. The tour's "racy" costumes were designed by fashion designer David Cardona, who commented "All her life it's been about Janet being cute. Now it's about Janet being sexy."

Concert synopsis
The show's setlist consists of twenty-six songs, several band interludes and over twenty dance numbers, along with nine costume changes and four different sets, in addition to frequent pyrotechnics and theatrics. At the beginning of the show, burgundy curtains accented by golden tassels are drawn apart, exposing an enormous book. It is covered by an equally large quilt embossed with "The Velvet Rope." A master of ceremonies opens the book, revealed to be an LED screen. Images dance across the screen until they explode and the screen splits, revealing Jackson behind it. She is subsequently lowered by elevator onto the main stage and the book stand is removed, leaving the screen hanging in place. It then moves to the back of the stage, followed by the appearance of the band and dancers.

The concert opens and closes with a giant storybook containing a massive LED video screen, among the first technology of its kind at the time. The book opens, revealing a frontispiece consisting of stars and planets before its covers split, floating backward and lit up into dual video screens. Jackson emerges between the screens in a top hat and velvet suit, resembling a "19th century British merchant", along with eight dancers to perform opening number "Velvet Rope", using a refrain of The Exorcist theme. After transitioning into "If", Jackson stares at the audience in silence for several minutes to cheering and applause before performing "You." Jackson is backed by dancers strutting alongside her wearing dual-sided masks, representing an isolated persona. Jackson then takes to a center stage stool to perform unplugged versions of "Let's Wait Awhile" and "Again" with an acoustic guitarist. A "frenzied" medley of hits from Control succeeds the ballads, including "Control", "The Pleasure Principle", "What Have You Done for Me Lately", and "Nasty", as well as janet.'s erotic house number "Throb." The red velvet curtain closes the stage while a "hidden light-and sound show" likened to extraterrestrial film Close Encounters entertains the crowd during set changes. The stage reveals the "deranged madness" of the following "hallucinatory" segment, featuring Jackson in a jester's headdress and satin bustier, with dancers dressed as "flowers, Mad Hatters, and horny gnomes" in a "Wonderland" setting. Jackson performs an upbeat medley of "Escapade", "When I Think of You", "Miss You Much", "Runaway", and "Love Will Never Do (Without You)" across a "blindingly bright, poppy-induced set design" with varied props, which include a smiling clock tower, inflatable moons, mammoth chaise, vases, and books.

The set transitions into a "steamy burlesque house" with a succession of "Alright", "I Get Lonely", and instrumental interlude of "Any Time, Any Place." Jackson strips to a black bra and tight pants during "Rope Burn", selecting a participant from the crowd at random, "pointing and demanding, "You!". The chosen fan is strapped into a chair as Jackson proceeds to pole dance and perform a striptease and lap dance, planting a kiss on the fan for the finale. "Black Cat" is followed by an emotionally charged rendition of the rock-influenced "What About", one of the tour's most controversial and praised renditions. Jackson narrates as four dancers demonstrate two vignettes of domestic violence in abusive relationships, including rape and physical abuse, concluding in a gun pulled on the abusers in self-defense. Proceeding is "Rhythm Nation", in which Jackson rapidly dances using martial arts movements and nunchucks, followed by the ballad "Special." The tour's encore includes chandeliers and a final outfit change, performing "That's the Way Love Goes", "Got 'til It's Gone", and "Go Deep" before concluding with "Together Again." Piano ballad "Every Time" and "Whoops Now" were performed exclusively on selected international dates.

Critical reception

Sean Daly of Rolling Stone commended the show's "Vegas-style glam" and Jackson's "pure showmanship" as providing "a hellzapoppin' spectacle that featured enough over-the-top special effects to make Armageddon look like Driving Miss Daisy." The concert was considered "a lust-driven fairy tale", featuring "a giant storybook, containing a massive video screen" which opened and closed the show. Its varied themes were contrasted with psychiatric thrillers A Clockwork Orange and Solid Gold, being "as damn freaky as it sounds", using a color scheme described as "a well-lighted explosion at the Crayola factory." The show's second segment was analyzed as "deranged madness", questioning "Can this really be little Penny from Good Times?" Daly praised Jackson's "breakneck speed" and favorably considered it "summer-entertainment bliss", adding "Janet's still as nasty as she wants to be." Sean Piccoli of The Sun Sentinel applauded the tour as a "birth of a new form of entertainment", effectively taking "music-video fundamentalism to a new extreme in live performance." Jackson's "athletic, superchoreographed presentation" was considered "sheery sensory thrill", thought to have "made Spice World look like public theater." The show was analyzed to be "as much a broadcast as it was a show", transitioning through "a seamless whirl of songs, costumes and set changes." Jackson's performances were described as a "technicolor barrage", ranging from "punched-up, steely grooves" to "pillowy, whispered ballads." Piccoli declared highlights to include the opening number, "an eerie incantation on the strangeness and isolation of celebrity", and the "explosively colorful" Control medley incorporating themes of "children's theater." The tour's rendition of "Rope Burn", showcasing Jackson as she "coaxed a young man from the audience onstage for a veritable striptease routine – for which the fellow was strapped by wristbands to his seat", was also praised. However, the show's unplugged ballad segment was thought to be "the evening's most unadorned moment." Piccoli added the crowd's "animated cheering" had been the most the arena had mustered in his experience.

Robert Hilburn of The Los Angeles Times favorably reviewed the tour, exclaiming "There is so much of the ambition and glamour of a Broadway musical in Janet Jackson's new Velvet Rope Tour that it's only fitting that the concert program credits her as the show's creator and director." Although "those aren't terms normally employed in the pop-rock world", Hilburn applauded Jackson's credibility in portraying "a dazzling package, complete with snappy choreography, a colorful array of costumes and often striking staging." Hilburn observed "there were several moments in the show when Jackson stepped beyond the production values and touched us in a way the best pop performers have done over the years." Emphasis was placed on the "playfulness of the fairy tale staging" of "Escapade", the "artful musical stretch" of "Got 'Til It's Gone", and the intimacy of "soul-searching" ballad "Special", adding "Jackson has put a personal stamp on this show that humanizes not only the music but also the performer too." Jackson's "radiance and warmth" was believed to be the result of "her own new-found self esteem", overcoming some of the insecurities plaguing her since childhood. Upon the show's encore Jackson "lingered, clinging to the thunderous applause" in a way which "demonstrated a personal vulnerability and warmth", considered its "real breakthrough." Hilburn stated "the tour and album should go a long way toward helping Jackson finally get the credit she deserves as an artist." The tour's "computer design-phase" was considered "a marvel of precision" by Tom Moon of The Inquirer. Its "eerie, robotic aura of a video game" was thought to be complemented by pyrotechnics detonated "At all the right, surprising moments", a troupe of "lockstep" dancers likened to "a phalanx of marching insects", and "stylized stage sets", ranging from "a child's nursery to a swing-era street scene." The show's lengthy "high-concept medleys" and "power-as-aphrodisiac theme" where analyzed to be commanding and accentuated her physical presence, ripping off her blouse with "theatrical grandeur." Additionally, Jackson's rapid "clockwork" movement was thought to be "high price", declared as nearly mechanical in certain segments. Moon declared "The audience cheered throughout the lavish production; the glossy, every-note-in-its-place music hardly mattered: This was Janet, the noted control freak. The sexually ambiguous diva. The drill sergeant of the rhythm nation. She can do as she pleases."

Paul Sexton of The Times, who reviewed the opening concert at the Rotterdam Ahoy in Rotterdam, Netherlands, compared her two-hour performance to that of Broadway theatre, calling it "an audiovisual banquet." According to the Birmingham Post the concert at the NEC Arena was an "accomplishment." As the show began "after the impatient fans had worked themselves into a frenzy, Janet finally arrived amid a barrage of space-age pyro-technics. Of course, at an event such as this, the overall spectacle is as important as the music itself. In true Jackson tradition, the costumes and choreography in this show made for theatre of the highest order." Her vocal performance was complemented, as Let's Wait Awhile and "Again" "both showcased Janet's ability to belt out heartfelt, if slightly soppy ballads." Richard Harrington of The Washington Post commented "Jackson looked fabulous, danced fabulous, sang as close to fabulous as she ever has and in the end provided a fabulous two hours of entertainment that was equal parts rock concert, Las Vegas revue and Broadway musical." Steve Jones of USA Today remarked, "Janet Jackson had a sellout crowd for the kickoff of her first U.S. tour in four years, and she blew the fans away with imaginative staging and sheer exuberance." J. D. Considine of The Baltimore Sun noted "on albums, Jackson's sound isn't defined by her voice so much as by the way her voice is framed by the lush, propulsive production of Jimmy Jam and Terry Lewis. No surprise, then, that her concert took a similar approach, treating Jackson's voice as just one component in the overall spectacle ... But even though Jackson showed strength from time to time—her singing on "Black Cat" was commanding enough to hold its own against the wailing electric guitar."

Natasha Kassulke of the Wisconsin State Journal stated "The concert captured the scope of Jackson's talent from songwriter to singer, producer, actress, dancer and fashion diva." Similarly, Gemma Tarlach of the Milwaukee Journal Sentinel observed, "A tiny dynamo of constant motion, Jackson strutted, slunk and grooved her way from one end of the stage to the other ... Her voice, sometimes thin and girlish on her albums, sounded fuller and more powerful than ever. Michael's baby sister? Nope, the commander of her own rhythm nation, in complete control. The show was as much a feast visually as musically." Kevin Johnson of St. Louis Post-Dispatch commended the tour as "one of the flashiest on the concert scene." Elizabeth Aird, who reviewed Jackson's concert at GM Place, wrote "If there's a show sexier and more polished than Janet Jackson's The Velvet Rope extravaganza, it's only on Broadway ... Saturday night's show at GM Place was two hours of thrills pumped out by Jackson, her never-say-die dancers and her powerful band." James Sullivan of the San Francisco Chronicle observed her concert at the new arena "offered a career retrospective, punctuated by new material, periodic video diversions and fireworks." "The show was a lot like an '80s flashback, though to its credit Jackson's eight-piece band—bass, guitar, drums and percussion, two keyboardists and two backup singers—added some inventive layering to her older hits." Charles Passy of the Palm Beach Post reported Jackson's show at the Coral Sky Amphitheatre emphasized style over substance, commenting her "two-hour set was about half hormones—and half pyrotechnics. Without much in the way of a voice, she has sold her persona throughout her career. And as that persona has evolved from girlish teenager to sexually sophisticated woman, her albums—and tours—have provided a road map." Jet Magazine reported, "With wit, sass, dance and a whole lot of sex appeal, Janet turns her song and dance fest into one of the major musical events of the year. In fact, it has become the must-see concert of the year."

Jeannine Etter of Youth Outlook stated "Janet takes us from ballads to hard-core dance beats, and from sex to politics. The set changes appropriately reflect some of the stages of her musical development, from the more playful circus/funhouse vibe of light and playful songs like "Escapade" to the sexual side of Janet's music that keeps getting stronger and stronger as the years go by. During the performance, one lucky man is picked from the audience, strapped to a chair and "tortured" as Janet performs a highly erotic dance for him." The excerpt concluded "Janet is extremely beautiful, but she also demonstrates a humility obtained from pain, reflection and a sense of spirituality." Christine Robertson of Evening Post, who reviewed Jackson's concert in Wellington, New Zealand, exclaimed "The sleek choreography and superb dance spectacle saw Jackson seldom take a breath from one set to the next—her control of the stage complete. Most of the time she plunged into two decades of hits which give her the right to stand her ground" among her contemporaries. Jane Stevenson of The Toronto Sun exclaimed "pyrotechnics, set pieces and inflatables combine with non-stop singing and dancing for two hours of exhilarating entertainment."

Commercial reception 
The tour's premiere concert at the Joe Louis Arena sold out within three hours, prompting Jackson to add a second showing for a later date. It grossed over $33 million in the United States alone. Its European leg had completely sold out. The tour had an estimated worldwide attendance of nearly two million, reported to exceed ten million by The Honolulu Advertiser. The tour's closing date at the Aloha Stadium in Hawaii broke attendance records, exceeding its original capacity to accommodate additional ticket demands, making Jackson the only artist in the venue's history to do so. Jackson donated a portion of the tour's sales to America's Promise, an organization founded by Colin Powell to assist disenfranchised youth.

Broadcast and recordings 
The show's concert in New York City was broadcast on the HBO special The Velvet Rope: Live in Madison Square Garden. It received over 15 million viewers and surpassed the ratings of all four major networks among viewers subscribed to the channel. It was released on DVD as The Velvet Rope Tour: Live in Concert, certified platinum in the United States and Australia. Selected performance footage was also aired on MTV. A live music video for promotional single "You" contains concert footage filmed in Glasgow and Manchester. 

A promotional interview disc in which Jackson answers thirty-four tour questions was released in Europe. A special edition double disc set was issued to Best Buy stores in Germany in other parts of Europe, including a seventeen-minute interview and tour photo book. Its second disc features thirteen songs selected by Jackson, mainly of the trip hop genre, including Massive Attack, Esthero, and Dario G.

Legacy

The tour's themes, performances and choreography, have influenced artists of various genres as well as several professional dancers and choreographers. The theme of Pink's Funhouse Tour was likened to Jackson's Velvet Rope Tour among several critics, considered to have "clearly learned her tricks" from studying Jackson's performances. In particular, Pink's rendition of the Divinyls’ "I Touch Myself", depicting "a masturbatory fantasy brought to life", was considered "instantly" reminiscent of "Janet's Velvet Rope gropes." Christina Aguilera cited the tour as an inspiration, saying "I just love watching people's performance videos. And she, being an amazing performer ... I aspire to do my little shows like that one day." The "flashy Roberto Cavalli-designed costumes and preternatural interest in the risqué" of Aguilera's Back to Basics Tour were later considered "ripped right off the pages" of Jackson's Velvet Rope Tour by LA Daily News. The stage and props of Cher's Do You Believe? shows drew comparisons to Jackson's tour. MTV News likened the circus theme, costumes, and atmosphere of Panic! at the Disco's Nothing Rhymes with Circus Tour to have "most closely resembled Janet Jackson's audience-dividing, hypersexual 1998 Velvet Rope tour — all that was missing was a chair dance." The carnival theme and theatrics used in Japanese group Arashi's Arashi Marks 2008 Dream-A-Live shows were compared to Jackson's festival setting from the tour.

The tour was among the first concerts attended by Britney Spears, who commented "I remember the first time I went to her show, I was just like 'Oh my God,' I wanted to be her." Spears added, "she just has this presence that you're so drawn to her, you can't keep your eyes off her." Spears' rendition of "Stronger" on the Dream Within a Dream Tour referenced Jackson's performance of "You", performing in a similar vein among masked dancers wearing one-piece attire. Several performances and themes of Spears' Onyx Hotel Tour drew comparisons for its choreography and sensuality, as well as a reworked lounge version of "Baby One More Time" sonically reminiscent of Jackson's "Rope Burn." Spears' following tour The Circus Starring Britney Spears used a circus theme, observed to be partially inspired by segments of the tour. During "Lace and Leather" on the Femme Fatale Tour, Spears performed a lap dance for a selected fan while wearing a boa after a pole dance, considered a direct reference to Jackson's performance of "Rope Burn." An analysis of Rihanna's Last Girl on Earth tour observed there was "definitely a Janet vibe", particularly comparing Jackson's performance of "Rope Burn", "in which she tied an audience member to a bed and proceeded to seduce them", to Rihanna's rendition of "Skin." The critique added, "Fast forward 13 years later, and there was Rihanna, writhing around on a lucky audience member at the conclusion of Skin off her current Loud album." New Zealand's Stuff.co.nz praised Lady Gaga's Born This Way Ball as the best "pop-star show" since Jackson's Velvet Rope Tour.

In a documentary, Jay-Z revealed being inspired by a segment of Jackson's tour in which she stood in silence and stared at the crowd for several minutes to massive applause; imitating the technique during his own concerts. Beyoncé has also been reported to emulate a similar tactic during several live shows. JoJo praised the tour, tweeting "Janet Jackson Velvet Rope Tour DVD. Freaking out. Mesmerized. Living. Can't stop yelling at the tv screen. Omg." JoJo later recorded the album Agápē while The Velvet Rope Tour played on a studio television for inspiration. Canadian singer Anjulie became "obsessed with music" and "developed [my style] through watching" the tour, recalling "I remember seeing The Velvet Rope Tour and then getting the VHS of that, putting it on slow motion so that I could learn every single dance move." British artist Rowdy Superstar commended Jackson's performance of "If" and "stayed up the whole night learning all the choreography from the Velvet Rope Tour." BBC Asian Network presenter DJ Kayper called Jackson "hands down, the best female performer of all time", praising the tour's rendition of "Rhythm Nation" in which Jackson dances with nunchucks.

Jackson's performance of "Rope Burn" has influenced numerous artists to incorporate a similar routine during live shows. An anecdote stated "Her performance of this song, when she brought a fan on stage for a strip tease during The Velvet Rope Tour has been co-opted by the likes of Britney Spears and Rihanna in later years." Other artists observed to be inspired by the rendition include Pink, Beyoncé, Christina Aguilera, the Sugababes, Katy Perry, Nicki Minaj, and Chris Brown. Nicole Brown of Vibe stated "Long before Rihanna and Nicki were handing out lap dances like hot cakes, Miss Jackson revolutionized dirty dancing with her "Rope Burn" routine in 1998. Janet works her way up and down a pole before laying a passionate kiss on an excited male fan." A critique of Chris Brown's Fan Appreciation Tour remarked "Brown isn’t the only celeb getting freaky on stage with their fans, singer Janet Jackson was one of the first celebrities to get freaky with fans on a stage in front of thousands of on-lookers." Katy Perry was also thought to emulate the performance on the California Dreams Tour, in which she brought a male onstage and "teasingly traced a finger down his bare chest and stomach." The Guardian observed influence from Jackson in the Sugababes' performance of "Virgin Sexy" on the Angels with Dirty Faces Tour, "in which they lapdance around the sole member of the audience who is male and in his twenties", adding "It's a trick Janet Jackson did a few years ago, on her Velvet Rope tour." In 2013, Wall Street International reported the performance inspired American artist (who was exhibiting I London at the time), Alex Da Corte's painting "Velveteen (Wilson Kelvin McQuade)", offering the analogy "a lap dance performed by one artwork for another may be crass, yet too fitting to be ignored."

The tour notably promoted Justin Timberlake and Usher when Jackson selected both as its opening acts during their early careers, exposing them to a wider audience. Both artists credit Jackson as a major showmanship influence from both "an entertainment and evolution perspective." While Timberlake was part of 'N Sync, Jackson personally selected them to open for the tour, helping to introduce the relatively unknown group to the public. Timberlake said "I had her poster on my wall so I'm psyched", later describing the experience as "fulfilling." Jackson performed with the group on several dates, including joining them for a live a cappella rendition of Stevie Wonder's "Overjoyed." A biography stated it was a "highlight" moment for Timberlake which "gave Justin a chance to show his family and friends how far he had come." The tour was the largest audience the group performed for at the time, with JC Chasez commenting, "That was great because we got to see how a real professional tours. And not only that she is really sweet. We really enjoyed it." Chris Kirkpatrick added, "She is very good at entertaining. We learned a lot — that if people want to hear just the music, they can buy the CD. But it's the whole live aspect of changing the songs every night or the whole theatrical performance that she puts on. She's definitely one of our mentors when it comes to touring and the stage show. Her show told a story, and that's what people like to see." Following the tour, Timberlake and Jackson became "good friends", ultimately leading to Timberlake performing alongside Jackson during a segment of Jackson's controversial Super Bowl Halftime Show performance. Usher described opening for Jackson as "the biggest event" of his career and an "honor", saying "She's a definite entertainer, works hard and sweats every night. I learned a lot about how to make an artist look like a star." Nick Lachey and group 98 Degrees opened for several dates and experienced increased commercial success following the tour.

The tour was one of the first concerts to feature split-screen LED technology, among the first developed at the time. Dancer and choreographer Teresa Espinosa began her career on the tour and credits Jackson for her success, leading her to subsequently work with Britney Spears, Pink, Rihanna, Mariah Carey, and Selena Gomez. Espinosa stated "it was a great learning experience, she's the top of the top," commenting "Dance-wise, (she taught me) how to become a better dancer and performer, and that you also have your good and bad days. Most of all you can’t take things personally." Backing dancer Tiana Brown was inspired to pursue a professional dancing career after watching the tour. So You Think You Can Dance finalist Jessica King included the tour among her "favorite dance moments." It was also the first concert attended by So You Think You Can Dance choreographer Travis Wall. Choreographer Shaun Evaristo cited the tour as an inspiration, saying "That show changed my life and so did the dancers."

Awards and nominations
The Velvet Rope Tour was nominated for 4 Emmy Awards.

Set list
The following set list is from the April 16, 1998, show in Rotterdam, Netherlands. It is not intended to represent all dates throughout the tour.
 "Velvet Rope"
 "If"
 "You"
 "Let's Wait Awhile" / "Again"
 "Control" / "The Pleasure Principle"  / "What Have You Done for Me Lately" 
 "Nasty" (contain elements of "Put Your Hands Where My Eyes Could See")
 "Throb"
 "Escapade" / "When I Think of You" / "Miss You Much" 
 "Runaway" / "Whoops Now"
 "Alright"
 "I Get Lonely"
 "Any Time, Any Place" 
 "Rope Burn"
 "Black Cat"
 "What About"
 "Jungle Boogie" 
 "Rhythm Nation"
 "Special"
Encore
"That's the Way Love Goes"
 "Got 'til It's Gone"
 "Together Again"

Tour dates

Box office score data

Personnel

Band 
 Musical Director & Keys: Rex Salas
 Drums: Lil John Roberts
 2nd Keys: Darrel Smith
 Percussion: Terry Santiel
 Guitar: David Barry
 Bass: Sam Sims
 Main vocals: Janet Jackson
 Background vocals: Stacy Campbell and Rebecca Valadez

Dancers 
 Tina Landon (choreographer)
 Kelly Konno
 Gil Duldulao
 Michael Andrews
 Tyce Diorio
 Teresa Espinosa
 Shawnette Heard
 Nikki Pantenburg
 Robert Vinson

Notes

References

External links
 IMDB entry
 Rottentomatoes entry
 Mark Fisher set design and images

Janet Jackson concert tours
1998 concert tours
1999 concert tours